The following list of Carnegie libraries in New Mexico provides detailed information on United States Carnegie libraries in the Territory of New Mexico, where 3 libraries were built from 3 grants (totaling $32,000) awarded by the Carnegie Corporation of New York from 1902 to 1911.

Key

Carnegie libraries

Notes

References

Note: The above references, while all authoritative, are not entirely mutually consistent. Some details of this list may have been drawn from one of the references without support from the others.  Reader discretion is advised.

 
New Mexico
Libraries
Libraries